Abedin is an Arabic name and surname  ). There are also the variant Abideen and the shortened form Abdeen. Abedin means worshipping or worshippers.

People
Zainu-l-Abideen, "Jewel of the Worshipper", byname of  Ali ibn Husayn Zayn al-Abidin or Ali ibn Husayn (d. 713), a great-grandson of Muhammad
Abidin Bey (c. 1780–1827), an Albanian commander and politician of Egypt during the early era of Muhammad Ali's rule
Huma Abedin (born 1976), American aide to Senator Hillary Clinton
Humayra Abedin (born 1976), Bangladeshi physician
Ishaq Isa Abedeen (born 1988), Kenyan-born Bahraini runner
Kazi Zainul Abedin (1892–1962), Pakistani poet 
Minhajul Abedin (born 1965), Bangladeshi cricketer
Nurul Abedin (born 1964), Bangladeshi cricketer
Zainul Abedin (1914–1976), Bangladeshi artist
Avul Pakir Jainulabdeen Abdul Kalam (1931 – 2015), 11th President of India

Places
Named after Abidin Bey:
 Abdeen (Cairo), a district of Cairo
 Abdeen Palace, one of the official residences of the President of Egypt
 Abdeen Palace Incident of 1942, military confrontation that took place on 4 February 1942
 Abdeen, a village in the Bsharri District of Lebanon
 Abdeen Mosque, the main mosque  in the Wadi al-Joz neighborhood in eastern Jerusalem, named after Omar Abdeen
Abedin (crater), a crater on Mercury

See also
Vavodin, a village in Mazandaran Province, Iran, also known as Ābedīn
Aberdeen (disambiguation)